Olumide "Olu" Olamigoke (born September 19, 1990) is a Nigerian-American triple jumper who won a silver medal at the 2015 African Games. He was born in the United States to Nigerian parents, who immigrated there in 1986, and hence holds a dual Nigerian-American citizenship. He has a degree in human movement studies from Indiana University.

Competition record

References

1990 births
Living people
Nigerian male triple jumpers
American male triple jumpers
Athletes (track and field) at the 2015 African Games
Athletes (track and field) at the 2016 Summer Olympics
Olympic athletes of Nigeria
African Games silver medalists for Nigeria
African Games medalists in athletics (track and field)
People from Stafford, Virginia
Olympic male triple jumpers
Athletes (track and field) at the 2014 Commonwealth Games
Commonwealth Games competitors for Nigeria